Texas Gas Service is the third largest natural gas distribution company in the U.S. state of Texas. It is a regulated public utility which serves more than 884,000 customers in 100 communities, employing 800 employees. It operates 10,900 miles of service lines, pipelines and other natural gas distribution properties. Texas Gas Service is a division of ONE Gas, Inc.

History
Texas Gas Service was formed in 2003 when ONEOK purchased the Texas assets of Southern Union Company. Southern Union was created in far-west Texas in the 1920s and had since acquired properties in El Paso, Austin, the Rio Grande Valley and other regions of Texas now part of the Texas Gas Service territory. Texas Gas Service has an over 80 year tradition of utility service to customers throughout Texas.
ONEOK spun off Texas Gas Service and its two other distribution companies—Oklahoma Natural Gas Company and Kansas Gas Service—to form ONE Gas in February 2014.

References

External links
 Official Website

2003 establishments in Texas
Natural gas companies of the United States
Companies based in Texas
Oneok